This is a list of prefects of Primorje-Gorski Kotar County.

Prefects of Primorje-Gorski Kotar County (1993–present)

See also
Primorje-Gorski Kotar County

Notes

External links
World Statesmen - Primorje-Gorski Kotar County

Primorje-Gorski Kotar County